2013 Rugby League World Cup Group A is one of the four groups in the 2013 Rugby League World Cup. The group comprises Australia, England, Fiji and Ireland.

Ladder

All times are local – UTC+0/GMT in English venues. UTC+1/CET in French venues. UTC+0/WET in Irish venues. UTC+0/GMT in Welsh venues.

Australia vs England

Note: The match between Australia and England was the opening match of the World Cup, and was held at the Millennium Stadium in Cardiff as part of a double-header with Wales vs Italy.

Fiji vs Ireland

England vs Ireland

 The Attendance of 24,375 is still a stadium record crowd at the John Smiths Stadium

Australia vs Fiji

England vs Fiji

Australia vs Ireland

References

External links

2013 Rugby League World Cup